Eisstadion am Friedrichspark is an indoor sporting arena located in Mannheim, Germany.  The capacity of the arena as an ice hockey rink was 8,200.  It was the home arena of Adler Mannheim ice hockey team prior to the SAP Arena opening in 2005.

It was built in 1938 and had a long history of hockey games. The greatest event was the match against Düsseldorfer EG in the 1990s when the DEG was still the biggest player in German hockey. The stadium was then filled with over 10,500 people.

The arena is currently used by various inline hockey clubs, mainly ISC Mannheim, and spectator capacity has been reduced to 2,500. Friedrichspark is also the home of the MLRH Oktoberfest international inline hockey tournament.
Current manager of the rink is ex-NHL player Bob Sullivan

Indoor arenas in Germany
Indoor ice hockey venues in Germany
Buildings and structures in Mannheim
Sports venues in Baden-Württemberg